Rosa Mannion (born 1962) is a British operatic soprano who has sung leading roles both in the opera houses of the UK and Europe and in the recording studio. Although particularly known for her roles in the operas of Handel and Mozart, she sang a wide repertoire during her career including Violetta in La traviata and all three of the leading female roles in The Tales of Hoffmann (Olympia, Antonia, and Giulietta).

Mannion was born in Liverpool and studied at the Royal Scottish Academy of Music before making her operatic debut in 1984 as Adina in L'elisir d'amore with Scottish Opera. Her singing career was cut short by illness in 1998, and she now teaches singing privately and as a member of the teaching staff at Bath Spa University and London's Royal College of Music.

Recordings
Mannion's recordings include:
Mozart: Così fan tutte (as Dorabella). Monteverdi Choir; English Baroque Soloists; John Eliot Gardiner (conductor). Filmed live at the Théâtre du Châtelet in 1992, originally for television broadcast. Label: Deutsche Grammophon (DVD).
Handel: Orlando (as Dorinda). Les Arts Florissants; William Christie (conductor). Label: Erato (CD)
Leoncavallo: Pagliacci (as Nedda). London Philharmonic Orchestra; David Parry (conductor). Label: Chandos (CD)
Persuasion (as Concert Opera Singer). Based on the novel by Jane Austen, screenplay by Nick Dear, directed by Roger Michell, music by Jeremy Sams. BBC Television, 1995. Sony Pictures Classics / Columbia TriStar Home Video DVD.

References

1962 births
Living people
English operatic sopranos
Musicians from Liverpool
Alumni of the Royal Conservatoire of Scotland
Academics of the Royal College of Music
Women music educators
20th-century British women opera singers
Academics of Bath Spa University